Splicing factor, proline- and glutamine-rich is a protein that in humans is encoded by the SFPQ gene.

Interactions 

SFPQ has been shown to interact with PTBP1, NONO, CDC5L and Ubiquitin C.

References

Further reading